ʔEsdilagh (or Alexandria First Nation) is a First Nation community in the North Cariboo region of British Columbia, Canada.  It is the smallest of the six member communities that form the Tsilhqot'in National Government. Formerly, the people of this region were known as ʔElhdaqox-t'in, the people of the Sturgeon River (Where ʔElhdaqox refers to what is now called the Fraser River - ʔElhdachugh being sturgeon, and Yeqox being river). Today, the community goes by the name ʔEsdilagh, which in Tŝilhqot'in language means peninsula.

Chief and Councillors (Dec 2016 Election)
Chief: Troy Baptiste
Councillor: Chad Stump
Councillor: Howard Johnny
Councillor: William Baptiste

Treaty process
As a member of the Tŝilhqot'in National Government, ʔEsdilagh chose to opt-out of the British Columbia Treaty Process, instead fighting in the BC (and later Canada) Supreme Courts to prove unextinguished Aboriginal Title - see Tsilhqot'in Nation v British Columbia. After their win against the crown, the Tŝilhqot'in Nation has been undergoing negotiations with the Province of British Columbia under the "Nenqay Deni Accord" which will lead to the establishment of Category A "Title-like lands" and Category B "co-management" lands.

History
The history of this region is best told by the oral traditions of the Tŝilhqot'in elders - whereby stories are told in the traditional language after the sun goes down.

Formerly, the people of this region were known as ʔElhdaqox-t'in, the people of the Sturgeon River (Where ʔElhdaqox refers to what is now called the Fraser River - ʔElhdachugh being sturgeon, and Yeqox being river). Today, the community goes by the name ʔEsdilagh, which in Tŝilhqot'in language means peninsula.

During the time of the fur trade in British Columbia, many other First Nations settled in the region in order to trade with the nearby Hudson's Bay Company's Fort Alexandria. However, after two serious waves of Smallpox decimated Tŝilhqot'in populations in the late 1850s and early 1860s, the Tŝilhqot'in Nation decided it would be safest to extradite all non-Tŝilhqot'in peoples from their homeland. The threat of an intentional third wave of smallpox by one of Alfred Waddington's road crewmen in Bute Inlet was the trigger for the so-called Chilcotin War of 1864.

ʔEsdilagh was the birthplace of Chief Alexis who was himself ʔElhdaqox-t'in, and who the community of Alexis Creek, and the official name of the Chilcot'in Community of Tŝideldel (Alexis Creek Indian Band) is named.

Demographics

Economic Development

Programs and facilities
A new health centre was constructed in 2016, named after former ʔEsdilagh Chief Frank "Chendi" Joe.
The community has been developing agriculturally as well - with a new community/market garden and a commercial sized root cellar.

References

See also

Tsilhqot'in
Chilcotin language
Chilcotin District
Tsilhqot'in Tribal Council
Carrier-Chilcotin Tribal Council

Tsilhqot'in governments